In the study of formal theories in mathematical logic, bounded quantifiers (a.k.a. restricted quantifiers) are often included in a formal language in addition to the standard quantifiers "∀" and "∃". Bounded quantifiers differ from "∀" and "∃" in that bounded quantifiers restrict the range of the quantified variable. The study of bounded quantifiers is motivated by the fact that determining whether a sentence with only bounded quantifiers is true is often not as difficult as determining whether an arbitrary sentence is true.

Examples
Examples of bounded quantifiers in the context of real analysis include:

  - for all x where x is larger than 0
  - there exists a y where y is less than 0
  - for all x where x is a real number
  - every positive number is the square of a negative number

Bounded quantifiers in arithmetic 

Suppose that L is the language of Peano arithmetic (the language of second-order arithmetic or arithmetic in all finite types would work as well).
These quantifiers bind the number variable n and contain a numeric term t which may not mention n but which may have other free variables. ("Numeric terms" here means terms such as "1 + 1", "2", "2 × 3", "m + 3", etc.)

These quantifiers are defined by the following rules ( denotes formulas):

There are several motivations for these quantifiers.
 In applications of the language to recursion theory, such as the arithmetical hierarchy, bounded quantifiers add no complexity.
 In applications to the study of Peano arithmetic, the fact that a particular set can be defined with only bounded quantifiers can have consequences for the computability of the set. For example, there is a definition of primality using only bounded quantifiers: a number n is prime if and only if there are not two numbers strictly less than n whose product is n.  There is no quantifier-free definition of primality in the language , however. The fact that there is a bounded quantifier formula defining primality shows that the primality of each number can be computably decided.

In general, a relation on natural numbers is definable by a bounded formula if and only if it is computable in the linear-time hierarchy, which is defined similarly to the polynomial hierarchy, but with linear time bounds instead of polynomial. Consequently, all predicates definable by a bounded formula are Kalmár elementary, context-sensitive, and primitive recursive.

The superscript 0 is sometimes omitted.

Bounded quantifiers in set theory 
Suppose that L is the language  of the Zermelo–Fraenkel set theory, where the ellipsis may be replaced by term-forming operations such as a symbol for the powerset operation. These quantifiers bind the set variable x and contain a term t which may not mention x but which may have other free variables.

The semantics of these quantifiers is determined by the following rules:

This forms the basis of the Lévy hierarchy, which is defined analogously with the arithmetical hierarchy.

Bounded quantifiers are important in Kripke–Platek set theory and constructive set theory, where only Δ0 separation is included. That is, it includes separation for formulas with only bounded quantifiers, but not separation for other formulas. In KP the motivation is the fact that whether a set x satisfies a bounded quantifier formula only depends on the collection of sets that are close in rank to x (as the powerset operation can only be applied finitely many times to form a term). In constructive set theory, it is motivated on predicative grounds.

See also 
 Subtyping — bounded quantification in type theory
 System F<: — a polymorphic typed lambda calculus with bounded quantification

References 
 
 

Quantifier (logic)
Proof theory
Computability theory